Leucopogon melaleucoides is a species of flowering plant in the heath family Ericaceae and is endemic to eastern Australia. It is an erect, densely branched shrub with lance-shaped or egg-shaped leaves, and white, tube-shaped flowers arranged in spikes in upper leaf axils.

Description
The leaves are more or less glabrous and the lower surface is finely striated.

Taxonomy
Leucopogon melaleucoides was first formally described in 1839 by Augustin Pyramus de Candolle in his Prodromus Systematis Naturalis Regni Vegetabilis, from an unpublished description by Allan Cunningham from specimens he collected near the Hunter River. The specific epithet (melaleucoides) means "melaleuca-like".

Distribution and habitat
This leucopogon grows in the understorey of open woodland in south-eastern Queensland to as far south as Guyra in New South Wales.

References

melaleucoides
Ericales of Australia
Flora of New South Wales
Flora of Queensland
Plants described in 1839
Taxa named by Augustin Pyramus de Candolle